Giving Them Fits is a 1915 American short comedy film featuring Harold Lloyd. It was the first film to team up Lloyd with Snub Pollard and Bebe Daniels.

Plot
Luke (Harold Lloyd) works in a shoe store, but has difficulty focusing on work when a pretty girl is near.

Cast
 Harold Lloyd - Luke de Fluke
 Snub Pollard - Luke's Co-Worker (as Harry Pollard)
 Gene Marsh - Vamp Customer
 Bebe Daniels - Co-Worker

See also
 Harold Lloyd filmography
List of American films of 1915

External links

1915 films
1915 short films
American silent short films
1915 comedy films
American black-and-white films
Films directed by Hal Roach
Silent American comedy films
Lonesome Luke films
American comedy short films
1910s American films
1910s English-language films